Siddhartha: An Indian novel is a 1922 novel by Hermann Hesse that deals with the spiritual journey of self-discovery of a man named Siddhartha during the time of the Gautama Buddha. The book, Hesse's ninth novel, was written in German, in a simple, lyrical style. It was published in the U.S. in 1951 and became influential during the 1960s. Hesse dedicated the first part of it to Romain Rolland and the second part to Wilhelm Gundert, his cousin.

The word Siddhartha is made up of two words in Sanskrit language, siddha (achieved) + artha (what was searched for), which together means "he who has found meaning (of existence)" or "he who has attained his goals". In fact, the Buddha's own name, before his renunciation, was Siddhartha Gautama, prince of Kapilavastu. In this book, the Buddha is referred to as "Gotama".

Plot
The story takes place in the ancient Nepalese kingdom of Kapilavastu. Siddhartha decides to leave his home in the hope of gaining spiritual illumination by becoming an ascetic wandering beggar of the Śamaṇa. Joined by his best friend Govinda, Siddhartha fasts, becomes homeless, renounces all personal possessions, and intensely meditates, eventually seeking and personally speaking with Gautama, the famous Buddha, or Enlightened One. Afterward, both Siddhartha and Govinda acknowledge the elegance of the Buddha's teachings. Although Govinda hastily joins the Buddha's order, Siddhartha does not follow, claiming that the Buddha's philosophy, though supremely wise, does not account for the necessarily distinct experiences of each person. He argues that the individual seeks an absolutely unique, personal meaning that cannot be presented to him by a teacher. He thus resolves to carry on his quest alone.

Siddhartha crosses a river and the generous ferryman, whom Siddhartha is unable to pay, merrily predicts that Siddhartha will return to the river later to compensate him in some way. Venturing onward toward city life, Siddhartha discovers Kamala, the most beautiful woman he has yet seen. Kamala, a courtesan, notes Siddhartha's handsome appearance and fast wit, telling him that he must become wealthy to win her affections so that she may teach him the art of love. Although Siddhartha despised materialistic pursuits as a Śamaṇa, he agrees now to Kamala's suggestions. She directs him to the employ of Kamaswami, a local businessman, and insists that he have Kamaswami treat him as an equal rather than an underling. Siddhartha easily succeeds, providing a voice of patience and tranquility, which Siddhartha learned from his days as an ascetic, against Kamaswami's fits of passion. Thus Siddhartha becomes a rich man and Kamala's lover, though in his middle years he realizes that the luxurious lifestyle he has chosen is merely a game that lacks spiritual fulfillment. Leaving the fast-paced bustle of the city, Siddhartha returns to the river fed up with life and disillusioned, contemplating suicide before falling into a meditative sleep, and is saved only by an internal experience of the holy word, Om. The very next morning, Siddhartha briefly reconnects with Govinda, who is passing through the area as a wandering Buddhist.

Siddhartha decides to live the rest of his life in the presence of the spiritually inspirational river. Siddhartha thus reunites with the ferryman, named Vasudeva, with whom he begins a humbler way of life. Although Vasudeva is a simple man, he understands and relates that the river has many voices and significant messages to divulge to any who might listen.

Some years later, Kamala, now a Buddhist convert, is traveling to see the Buddha at his deathbed, accompanied by her reluctant young son, when she is bitten by a venomous snake near Siddhartha's river. Siddhartha recognizes her and realizes that the boy is his own son. After Kamala's death, Siddhartha attempts to console and raise the furiously resistant boy, until one day the child flees altogether. Although Siddhartha is desperate to find his runaway son, Vasudeva urges him to let the boy find his own path, much like Siddhartha did himself in his youth. Listening to the river with Vasudeva, Siddhartha realizes that time is an illusion and that all of his feelings and experiences, even those of suffering, are part of a great and ultimately jubilant fellowship of all things connected in the cyclical unity of nature. After Siddhartha's moment of illumination, Vasudeva claims that his work is done and he must depart into the woods, leaving Siddhartha peacefully fulfilled and alone once more.

Toward the end of his life, Govinda hears about an enlightened ferryman and travels to Siddhartha, not initially recognizing him as his old childhood friend. Govinda asks the now-elderly Siddhartha to relate his wisdom and Siddhartha replies that for every true statement there is an opposite one that is also true; that language and the confines of time lead people to adhere to one fixed belief that does not account for the fullness of the truth. Because nature works in a self-sustaining cycle, every entity carries in it the potential for its opposite and so the world must always be considered complete. Siddhartha simply urges people to identify and love the world in its completeness. Siddhartha then requests that Govinda kiss his forehead and, when he does, Govinda experiences the visions of timelessness that Siddhartha himself saw with Vasudeva by the river. Govinda bows to his wise friend and Siddhartha smiles radiantly, having found enlightenment. Thus he experiences a whole circle of life. He realizes his father's importance and love when he himself becomes a father and his own son leaves him to explore the outside world.

Characters
 Siddhartha: The protagonist.
 Govinda: Close friend of Siddhartha and follower of Gotama.
 Siddhartha's Father: A Brahmin who was unable to satisfy Siddhartha's quest for enlightenment.
 The Samanas: Traveling ascetics who tell Siddhartha that deprivation leads to enlightenment.
 Gotama: The Buddha, whose Teachings are rejected but whose power of self-experience and self-wisdom is completely praised by Siddhartha.
 Kamala: A courtesan, Siddhartha's sensual mentor, and mother of Young Siddhartha. 
 Kamaswami: A merchant who instructs Siddhartha on business.
 Vasudeva: An enlightened ferryman and spiritual guide of Siddhartha.
 Young Siddhartha: Son of Siddhartha and Kamala. Lives with Siddhartha for a time yet runs away to Adan.

Major themes
In Hesse's novel, experience, the totality of conscious events of a human life, is shown as the best way to approach understanding of reality and attain enlightenment⁠—⁠Hesse's crafting of Siddhartha's journey shows that understanding is attained not through intellectual methods, nor through immersing oneself in the carnal pleasures of the world and the accompanying pain of samsara; rather, it is the completeness of these experiences that allows Siddhartha to attain understanding.

Thus, individual events are meaningless when considered by themselves—⁠Siddhartha's stay with the Shramanas and his immersion in the worlds of love and business do not ipso facto lead to nirvana, yet they cannot be considered distractions, for every action and event gives Siddhartha experience, which in turn leads to understanding.

A major preoccupation of Hesse in writing Siddhartha was to cure his "sickness with life" (Lebenskrankheit) by immersing himself in Indian philosophy such as that expounded in the Upanishads and the Bhagavad Gita. The reason the second half of the book took so long to write was that Hesse "had not experienced that transcendental state of unity to which Siddhartha aspires. In an attempt to do so, Hesse lived as a virtual semi-recluse and became totally immersed in the sacred teachings of both Hindu and Buddhist scriptures. His intention was to attain to that 'completeness' which, in the novel, is the Buddha's badge of distinction." The novel is structured on three of the traditional stages of life for Hindu males (student (brahmacharin), householder (grihastha) and recluse/renunciate (vanaprastha)) as well as the Buddha's Four Noble Truths (Part One) and Eightfold Path (Part Two) which form twelve chapters, the number in the novel. Ralph Freedman mentions how Hesse commented in a letter "[my] Siddhartha does not, in the end, learn true wisdom from any teacher, but from a river that roars in a funny way and from a kindly old fool who always smiles and is secretly a saint." In a lecture about Siddhartha, Hesse claimed "Buddha's way to salvation has often been criticized and doubted, because it is thought to be wholly grounded in cognition. True, but it's not just intellectual cognition, not just learning and knowing, but spiritual experience that can be earned only through strict discipline in a selfless life". Freedman also points out how Siddhartha described Hesse's interior dialectic: "All of the contrasting poles of his life were sharply etched: the restless departures and the search for stillness at home; the diversity of experience and the harmony of a unifying spirit; the security of religious dogma and the anxiety of freedom." Eberhard Ostermann has shown how Hesse, while mixing the religious genre of the legend with that of the modern novel, seeks to reconcile with the double-edged effects of modernization such as individualization, pluralism or self-disciplining.

The character Siddhartha honors the character Gotama (Gautama Buddha) by not following him in person, but by following Gotama's example. This is an example of the Theravada tradition evolving later, but modeled by the Buddha's philosophy and values. This tradition holds that the path to enlightenment is a solitary one and that no person can lead another person to enlightenment. The codification of the Buddha's philosophy such as the Four Noble Truths and the Eightfold Path and the Pali canon are helpful guides. The path of each person is unknowable, and it's up to each person to discover the way. The irony is that the fictional character Siddhartha, who seemingly disrespects the Gotama, is the only follower of Gotama that achieves enlightenment because he does not worship him like a god, which is the Theravada tradition.

Film versions
A film version entitled Siddhartha was released in 1972. It stars Shashi Kapoor and was directed by Conrad Rooks.

In 1971, a surrealistic adaptation as a musical Western was released as Zachariah. John Rubinstein starred in the title role and George Englund was the director. Don Johnson played Matthew, the equivalent of Govinda.

English translations
Several American publishers have commissioned new translations of the novel since it left US copyright in 1998. In addition to these newer translations, Hilda Rosner's original 1951 translation is still being sold in a number of reprint editions put out by various publishers. The newest translations include:
 1951: Hilda Rosner
1998: Sherab Chödzin Kohn, for Shambhala Classics, introduction by Paul W. Morris and translator's preface
1999: Joachim Neugroschel, for Penguin, introduction by Ralph Freedman and translator's note
 1999: Stanley Applebaum, for Dover Thrift Edition, introduction and glossary anon.
2006: Susan Bernofsky, for Modern Library, foreword by Tom Robbins and translator's preface
 2007: Rika Lesser, for Barnes & Noble, introduction by Robert A. Thurman

Translations in Indian languages

 Telugu translation of "Siddhartha" by Bellamkonda Raghava Rao from English translation of the book by Hilda Rosner (1957)
 Centre for South Indian Studies, Malayalam translation by R. Raman Nair (1990).
 Hermann Hesse Society of India, Sanskrit translation by L Sulochana Devi (2008)
 Hermann Hesse Society of India, Hindi translation by Prabakaran Hebbar Illath (2012)
 Hermann Hesse Society of India, Marathi translation by Avinash Tripathi (2007)
 Bishwo Shahitto Kendro, Bengali translation by Zafar Alam (2002)
 Tamil translation of Siddhartha by Jevita Naresh (2017)
Siddhartha translated in Punjabi by Dr. Hari Singh
 Siddhartha translated into Urdu by Asif Farkhi
 Siddhartha translated into Pashto by Shaheen Buneri (Feburary 2021)

In popular culture
 Musical references
 Canadian composer Claude Vivier wrote the orchestral piece Siddhartha in 1976, inspired by the book.
 The 1972 Yes song "Close to The Edge" from the album Close to the Edge was inspired by the book.
 Nick Drake's song "River Man" from his 1969 album Five Leaves Left was inspired by the book. According to Drake's manager, Joe Boyd, Drake thought of the song as the centrepiece of the album.
 Pete Townshend's song "The Ferryman" was written for a modern production of Siddhartha in June 1976.
 The Slovenian rock band Siddharta was named after the novel.
 Ten Mile Tide wrote a song entitled "Siddhartha" which provides a musical version of the novel.
 Ralph McTell wrote the song "The Ferryman" also based on the novel for his 1971 album You Well-Meaning Brought Me Here.
 The song "The Samanas" written by Doyle Bramhall II refers to the journey of the Samana in this book.
 Referenced on the album Dark Matter Dreams by Field Division on the track called "Siddhartha" and referenced in the track "Lay Cursed".
 Jerry Cantrell named the nineteenth track of his 2002 sophomore album Degradation Trip Volumes 1 & 2 after the book.
 The band Syd Arthur, formed in 2003 in Canterbury, got their name from the book.
 The Canadian band Eight Seconds' song "Where's Bula" was inspired by the book.
 The wind ensemble composition "That Secret from the River" by Joel Puckett is based on the following quotation from the book. 

Have you also learned that secret from the river; that there is no such thing as time? That the river is everywhere at the same time, at the source and at the mouth, at the waterfall, at the ferry, at the current, in the ocean and in the mountains, everywhere and that the present only exists for it, not the shadow of the past nor the shadow of the future.

 Other cultural references
 Fred Mayer published the photographic essay "Homage to Hermann Hesse and His Siddhartha", which is based on Hesse's novel.
 In season one of Veronica Mars, episode 19 ("Hot Dogs"), movie star Aaron Echolls (Harry Hamlin) is seen reading Siddhartha on the couch while his two children, Trina and Logan, speak with him.
 In the season 7 finale of Shameless on Showtime, Fiona Gallagher finds a copy of Siddhartha in her dead mother's belongings. Fiona is seen reading the book throughout the episode and recites an unheard excerpt at Monica's funeral.
 In season 4 episode 3 of Parks and Recreation, Chris Traeger claims to have speedread the entirety of the novel at a traffic stop.
 In season 2 episode 2 of the series American Gods depicts young Shadow Moon reading an English copy of the novel.

References

External links

 
 Full texts of Siddhartha in German and English translation from Project Gutenberg

1922 German-language novels
1922 German novels
Ancient India in popular culture
Buddhist novels
Fictional Buddhist monks
German bildungsromans
German novels adapted into films
German philosophical novels
Novels about Indian prostitution
Novels by Hermann Hesse
Novels set in India
Swiss novels adapted into films